XHTCH-FM is a radio station in Tapachula, Chiapas. Broadcasting on 102.7 MHz, XHTCH is part of the Sistema Chiapaneco de Radio, Televisión y Cinematografía state network and is known as Océano FM.

History
XHTCH signed on October 19, 1994 broadcasting with 12 kW ERP. In 2001 the station boosted its power to 92 kW, expanding its coverage and making it one of the most powerful radio stations in Chiapas.

When Hurricane Stan hit Chiapas in 2005, XHTCH was the lone station on air, providing news and information.

References

Public radio in Mexico
Radio stations in Chiapas